Bahram Atef (born 2 February 1941 in Tehran, Iran) is an Iranian football manager and academic. He coached Zob Ahan and Esteghlal Ahvaz. He is current technical manager of Zob Ahan.

References

1941 births
Living people
Zob Ahan Esfahan F.C. managers
Iranian football managers
Esteghlal Ahvaz F.C. managers
Persian Gulf Pro League managers